Graham Charles Bond (30 December 1932 – June 1998) was an English professional footballer who played as an inside forward, most notably for Torquay United in the 1950s.

References

1932 births
1998 deaths
Sportspeople from Torquay
English footballers
Association football forwards
Torquay United F.C. players
Exeter City F.C. players
Weymouth F.C. players
Bideford A.F.C. players